The German Turnfest 1933 took place in Stuttgart. It was carried out from 21 to 31 July. The patron was President Paul von Hindenburg. The Turnfest attracted 600,000 people, 120,000 taking part in the games.

External links 

 Deutsches Turnfest 1933 on the Website of the Deutschen Turnerbundes

1933 in German sport
History of Stuttgart